Mandarin rolls, Steamed Mandarin rolls, Flower Buns, or Huā juǎn are a kind of steamed bun originating from China. The rolls are cooked by steaming. It is another one of the staples of Chinese cuisine, which is similar to white bread in western cuisine. Because southern varieties of mandarin rolls are slightly sweet, they can be eaten plain. Sometimes it is eaten with sweetened condensed milk. The rolls are made of wheat flour, water, sugar, soybean oil, vegetable shortening, milk powder, salt, yeast and baking soda.

See also
 Mantou
 List of buns
 List of steamed foods

References

Chinese breads
Steamed buns
Vegetarian dishes of China